is a railway station in Tenri, Nara, Japan, serving passengers traveling on Kintetsu Railway's Tenri Line. It is 3.2 km (2.0 mi) from Hirahata, while 1.3 km (0.81 mi) from Tenrii.

Lines 
 Kintetsu Railway
 Tenri Line

Platforms and tracks

History
 Feb. 7, 1915—Senzai Station was opened by the Tenri Light Railway.
 1921—Acquired by the Osaka Electric Tramway.
 1922—The rail gauge was widened to 1,435mm.
 1941—Owned by the Kansai Express Railway that merged with the Sangu Express Railway.
 1944—Owned by the Kintetsu Railway that merged with the Nankai Railway
 Apr. 1, 2007—PiTaPa, a reusable contactless stored value smart card, has been available.

Surrounding 
 Tenri Municipal Medical Center
 Tenri University

External links
 

Railway stations in Nara Prefecture
Railway stations in Japan opened in 1915